Drohi (English: Traitor) has appeared as the title of several films.

 Drohi (1948 film), Telugu film by L. V. Prasad
 Drohi (1970 film), 1970 Telugu film directed by K. Bapayya.
 Drohi (1982 film), 1982 Malayalam film directed by P. Chandrakumar.
 Drohi (1992 film), Hindi film by Ram Gopal Varma
 Drohi (1996 film), Telugu film by P. C. Sreeram
 Drohi (2010 film), Tamil film by Sudha Kongara